Pawnshop Guitars is the debut solo album by the former Guns N' Roses guitarist Gilby Clarke, released in 1994 via Virgin Records. The album was produced by session guitarist Waddy Wachtel, and along with all the then-current or former members of Guns N' Roses, it features contributions from Pixies vocalist Frank Black, guitarist Ryan Roxie and then-Skid Row drummer Rob Affuso among others.

Track listing 
All songs by Gilby Clarke, unless otherwise stated.

 "Cure Me... Or Kill Me..." (feat. Slash) – 4:56
 "Black" (feat. Matt Sorum & Dizzy Reed)– 4:21
 "Tijuana Jail" (feat. Slash & Matt Sorum) – 5:08
 "Skin & Bones" – 3:17
 "Johanna's Chopper" – 4:08
 "Let's Get Lost"  (feat. Dizzy Reed) (Clarke/Daniel) – 3:31
 "Pawn Shop Guitars" (feat. Matt Sorum) – 3:51
 "Dead Flowers" (feat. Axl Rose) (Mick Jagger, Keith Richards) – 4:13
 "Jail Guitar Doors" (feat. Duff McKagan & Frank Black) (Joe Strummer, Mick Jones) – 3:10
 "Hunting Dogs" – 3:15
 "Shut Up" (feat. Dizzy Reed) – 3:58
 "West Of The Sunset" – 3:17   (Japanese Edition Bonus Track)

Personnel 
 Gilby Clarke – vocals, guitars, piano, sitar

Additional musicians
 Axl Rose – vocals, background vocals on "Dead Flowers", piano
 Slash – lead guitar on "Cure Me... Or Kill Me..." and "Tijuana Jail"
 Duff McKagan – bass on "Jail Guitar Doors"
 Matt Sorum – drums
 Dizzy Reed – mellotron, hammond organ, calliope
 Jo Almeida – guitar
 Frank Black – guitars, background vocals on "Jail Guitar Doors"
 Ryan Roxie – guitars
 Waddy Wachtel – guitars, producer
 Teddy Andreadis – hammond organ
 Will Effertz – bass
 Jonathan Daniel – bass
 Rob Affuso – drums, percussion
 Marc Danzeisen – drums, percussion, background vocals
 Eric Skodis – drums, background vocals, jaw harp
 John Schubert – drums
 Roberta Freeman – background vocals
 Joel Derouin – fiddle
 Dean Clark – cowbell

References

External links 
 

Gilby Clarke albums
1994 debut albums
Albums produced by Waddy Wachtel
Virgin Records albums